Telenor ASA ( or ) is a Norwegian majority state-owned multinational telecommunications company headquartered at Fornebu in Bærum, close to Oslo. It is one of the world's largest mobile telecommunications companies with operations worldwide, but focused in Scandinavia and Asia. It has extensive broadband and TV distribution operations in four Nordic countries, and a 10-year-old research and business line for machine-to-machine technology. Telenor owns networks in 8 countries.

Telenor is listed on the Oslo Stock Exchange and had a market capitalization in November 2015 of kr 225 billion, making it the third largest company listed on the OSE after DNB and Equinor (previously known as Statoil).

History

Telegraph
Telenor started off in 1855, as a state-operated monopoly provider of telegraph services named Telegrafverket. The first Norwegian planning  for a telegraph were launched within the Royal Norwegian Navy in 1848,  but by 1852, the plans were public and the Parliament of Norway decided on a plan for constructing a telegraph system throughout the country. Televerket began by connecting Christiania (now Oslo) to Sweden (Norway was at that time in a union with Sweden) as well as Christiania and Drammen. By 1857, the telegraph had reached Bergen on the west coast via Sørlandet on the south coast, and by 1871, it had reached Kirkenes on the far north coast. Cable connections were opened to Denmark in 1867 and to Great Britain in 1869. The telegraph was most important for the merchant marine who now could use the electric telegraph to instantly communicate between different locations, and get a whole new advantage from better logistics.

Telephone
The first telephone service in Norway was offered in 1878, between Arendal and Tvedestrand, while the first international telephone service between Christiania and Stockholm was offered in 1893. Automation of the telephone system was started in 1920, and completed in 1985. In 1946, the first Telex service was offered, and in 1976, satellite telephone connections to the Norwegian merchant navy, at the time the largest in the world and to oil platforms in the North Sea were made operational. This is the start of Inmarsat Satellite Communication, and formed the first steps to digitalise the telephone network in 1980–1985.

Televerket opened its first manual mobile telephone system in 1966, being replaced with the automatic NMT system in 1981, and the enhanced NMT-900 in 1986. Norway was the first country in to get an automatic mobile telephone system. The digital GSM system came into use in 1993. The third generation of mobile technology with UMTS system began full operation 2004. The Opera web browser was created in 1994 by Jon Stephenson von Tetzchner and Geir Ivarsøy during their tenure at Telenor, and  Opera Software was established in 1995, when they  went on to continue development of their browser. Telenor and Huawei conducted a  successful test of 5G with 70 Gbit/s Speeds in Lab environment.

Deregulation and internationalisation
The corporation changed its name to Televerket in 1969. In 1994, then the Norwegian Telecom was established as a public corporation.  The telecom sector in Norway,  was deregulated in stages between 1994 and 1998. An attempt to merge Telenor with its counterpart in Sweden, Telia, failed in 1999, while both still were owned by their respective governments. On 4 December, 2000, the company was partially privatised and listed on Oslo Stock Exchange and NASDAQ. The privatisation gave the company  in new capital, with the Government of Norway owning 77.7% of the company. As of 2014, the Norwegian government holds 53.97% of the Telenor shares directly and another 4.66% through the Pension Fund.

In the second half of the 1990s, Telenor began mobile operations in other countries: Russia (1994), Bangladesh, Greece, Ireland, Germany and Austria (1997), Ukraine (1998), Malaysia (1999), Denmark and Thailand (2000), Hungary (2002), Montenegro (2004), Pakistan (2004), Slovakia, Czech Republic, Serbia (2006), Myanmar (2014). Operations in Greece, Ireland and Germany were sold in 1999/2000, and profits were re-invested in  emerging markets. In October 2005, Telenor acquired Vodafone Sweden, changing the name to Telenor in April 2006.

Grameenphone was the first Telenor venture in the Asian telecom market and is now the largest mobile operator in Bangladesh, Telenor holds 55.8 per cent of the company. Grameenphone started trading its shares on the stock exchanges in Dhaka and Chittagong on 16 November 2009. The success of Grammeenphone lead to an increased focus on Asia, with successful entries into Malaysia, Thailand Pakistan, and Myanmar. Telenor also entered India, but had to withdraw from that market in 2017, with substantial losses.

In March 2018, Telenor sold its business in Southeast Europe (Bulgaria, Hungary, Montenegro and Serbia) to the PPF Group, for a sum of 2.8 billion euros in order to focus more on Asia and the Nordic market. 
 
In 2019, Telenor bought DNA, the third largest mobile operator in Finland.

On 21 June 2021, Axiata, Telenor and Digi agree to a potential merger of Celcom and Digi to create a stronger telco in Malaysia, which if approved will be completed by the end of 2022. This come after advanced discussions two months earlier. The deal was approved by both Celcom and Digi shareholders on 18 November 2022. The merged company is named CelcomDigi. At completion, Axiata and Telenor will hold equal ownership of 33.1% each in the newly merged company. The merger was completed on 30 November 2022 and the company began its operation the next day.

On 22 November 2021, Telenor and Charoen Pokphand Group, officially announced they have agreed to explore a USD 8.6 billion merger plan between Thailand’s second and third largest telecom operators (by subscribers), True Corporation (TRUE) and Total Access Communication (DTAC) – the proposed merger is subject to regulatory approvals. The merger was "acknowledged" by the regulator NBTC at a meeting on October 20, 2022. The newly merged company still retain the True Corporation name, which was founded on 1 March 2023 and it was listed on the Stock Exchange of Thailand under the stock ticker symbol TRUE on 3 March 2023.

Operations
Telenor offers a full range of telecommunication services in the Nordic countries, including mobile and fixed telephony, Internet access and as well as cable TV access and content. Telenor still remains the largest actor in Norway despite competition from Telia and others.

The group holds a prominent position in the Scandinavian Broadband and TV market, both with regard to the number of subscribers and to the extent of coverage. The TV distribution is branded Allente. Telenor is also a prominent actor in Asia with operations in five different Asian countries.

At year-end 2021, Telenor held controlling interests in mobile operations in Norway, Denmark, Finland, Sweden, Thailand, Malaysia, Bangladesh, Myanmar and Pakistan. The Myanmar operation was announced sold in 2021, and the transaction completed in March 2022.

Telenor Maritime Radio is responsible for the infrastructure for maritime radio communication in Norway, and also includes five staffed coast radio stations whose primary purpose is to monitor the maritime radio traffic (over e.g. VHF and MF bands) and to assist marine vessels in distress.

Research
Telenor Research is Telenor's corporate unit for research. The unit conducts research and delivers research based advice on topics such as market, technology, data analytics, innovation and organization. Telenor Research provides research based analysis and strategic recommendations to the Telenor Group, as well as to the individual Business Units across Telenor markets. Telenor Research's mission is to create business value for Telenor through applied research.

Machine-to-machine
Telenor started exploring the M2M potentials in 2000, when Telenor R&D established a project both aimed at technology, services and business models. This was further spurred when Telenor acquired the Swedish mobile company Europolitan, which contained parts of Vodafone's research capabilities in the area. As a result, two separate companies have been established: Telenor Connexion in Stockholm, Sweden (aiming higher up in the M2M value chain), and Telenor Objects (aiming further down in the value chain). The initiative has resulted in a substantial market share of Europe's fast-growing M2M market and is being used by Nissan in Europe to connect its customers' Electric Cars.

Broadcast
Telenor's wholly owned subsidiary Canal Digital is a leading TV content distributor in the Nordic region with about 2.7 million customers in 2011. On 13 April, 2021, the merger of Canal Digital and Viasat in Allente was completed.

Telenor also operates the national terrestrial broadcast network in Norway, through its subsidiary Norkring.

Thor is a family of satellites owned by Telenor. On 11 February, 2008, the THOR 5 satellite was launched into geostationary orbit. The launch was provided by International Launch Services using a Proton-M launch vehicle built by Khrunichev Space Center. Telenor operates three satellites from its satellite control centre at Fornebu (THOR5, THOR6 & THOR7)

Former operations
Telenor has sold a number of divisions after its privatisation, including Bravida, the former installation division and Findexa, now part of Eniro that is responsible for telephone directories. The browser vendor Opera Software originated in Telenor's R&D department. Telenor formerly  provided a range of services related to satellite communication, including voice, television and data before its Telenor Satellite Services division was purchased by Vizada in 2007.

Telenor has also previously been active in a number of international markets as a mobile phone network operator:

See also
 COMSAT mobile communications
 AeroMobile
 Opera Software ASA

References

External links 

 
Telecommunications companies established in 1977
Government-owned companies of Norway
Norwegian brands
Mobile phone companies of Norway
Mobile phone companies of Sweden
Telecommunications companies of Norway
Internet service providers of Norway
Internet service providers of Sweden
Formerly government-owned companies of Norway
Defunct government agencies of Norway
Companies listed on the Oslo Stock Exchange
Companies based in Bærum
Multinational companies headquartered in Norway
Norwegian companies established in 1977